Cecil Henry Clinkard (1862 – 24 March 1941) was a United Party Member of Parliament in New Zealand, and the first mayor of Rotorua.

Early life
Clinkard was born in 1862 in Oxfordshire, England. He came to New Zealand with his parents in 1867. His father, Thomas Clinkard, was the first European settler at Makarau on the Kaipara Harbour, where for three years his mother did not set eyes on a white woman. Being brought up to bush work, he commenced as a bush contractor at the age of 16, and mainly worked in the timber industry as a young adult. He took up large tracts of bush country and then worked out the timber, having it towed to Wairoa, from where it got shipped to London, Sydney, Adelaide, and the southern ports of New Zealand.

Clinkard was then one of the original settlers of the Mamaku area in the Bay of Plenty. Later, he lived at Devonport. He moved to Rotorua in 1917 and became a taxi proprietor.

Political career

Clinkard was secretary to the Kaukapakapa Road Board.

On the formation of the Rotorua Borough Council in 1923, Clinkard was elected as the inaugural mayor of Rotorua and served in that role until 1927. Following his mayoralty, he served on the Borough Council for another year. He was Rotorua's representative on the Tauranga Harbour Board.

He won the Rotorua electorate in 1928, but was defeated in 1935, when he came third out of four candidates.

In 1935, he was awarded the King George V Silver Jubilee Medal. Clinkard was a member of the Rotorua Rotary Club, and was active on the school committee.

Family and death
On 11 July 1883, Clinkard married Julia Letitia Hooper (born 1862) at Onehunga. She was the daughter of the late Charles Hooper of Somersetshire, later Warkworth. Their eldest son was also named Cecil Henry; he married Margaret Tessier Gray in 1914. Four other sons, Charles Thomas, Sidney Eric, George William, and Alfred Edwin served in World War I. George William Clinkard was later a notable public servant and trade commissioner.

His wife died on 26 July 1932 at Auckland Hospital; Clinkard was a member of parliament at the time. His grandson, Derek Charles Gray Clinkard (the eldest son of his eldest son), died on 8 March 1940 in a plane crash in World War II. A year later, Cecil Clinkard died on 24 March 1941 aged 79 at Rotorua after a long illness. He was survived by five sons.

Notes

References
 This article incorporates text from a publication now in the public domain: 

1862 births
1941 deaths
Mayors of Rotorua
United Party (New Zealand) MPs
Members of the New Zealand House of Representatives
New Zealand MPs for North Island electorates
Unsuccessful candidates in the 1905 New Zealand general election
Unsuccessful candidates in the 1922 New Zealand general election
Unsuccessful candidates in the 1925 New Zealand general election
Unsuccessful candidates in the 1935 New Zealand general election
English emigrants to New Zealand
People from Oxfordshire